R.S. McLaughlin Collegiate and Vocational Institute is a secondary school located in Oshawa, Ontario within the Durham District School Board.

Academics
Named after Robert Samuel McLaughlin, the school offers a variety of classes including science, math, art, English, music, French, history, geography, and more. The school also offers French immersion classes for students who graduated from a French immersion school in grade eight.

Incidents
On January 3, 2012, during the 2011/2012 Winter Holidays, the school had a fire inside the gymnasium. The damage was 'just over $1 million'. This caused the school's original plans to have the 50th anniversary in May, to be pushed back several months, but classes still resumed on  January 9. On February 23, 2012, the school had another fire in one of the boys' washrooms.

Notable alumni
 Bobby Orr, professional ice hockey defencemen
 John Henry (Ontario politician), Ontario politician

See also
 List of high schools in Ontario

References

External links
 R S McLaughlin Collegiate and Vocational Institute
 City of Oshawa

High schools in Oshawa
Educational institutions in Canada with year of establishment missing